The Rendezvous is a 1923 American silent adventure melodrama film with comedic overtones directed by Marshall Neilan and starring Richard Travers, Conrad Nagel, Lucille Ricksen, and Syd Chaplin. It was produced and distributed by Goldwyn Pictures.

Plot
As described in a film magazine review, in the Russian Empire, Prince Sergei and his wife Varvara are exiled to Siberia by the Tsar Nicholas II. Varvara dies giving birth to a daughter, Vera, who is left in a friend's care by the father. 18 years later, Cossacks raid the country. Walter Stanford, an officer in the American Expeditionary Force, Siberia, rescues Vera from a Cossack raid at a shrine, but she is forced to wed a Cossack chief. After the chief is killed, Vera and Stanford are united and they marry.

Cast

Production 
The film was shot in San Francisco and Los Angeles using real-life U.S. Army soldiers as extras.

Preservation status
This is a surviving silent film preserved by Metro-Goldwyn-Mayer.

References

External links

Faded poster (archived)
Lobby card (archived)
Stills at www.sydchaplin.com (bottom 2 rows)

1923 films
American silent feature films
American black-and-white films
Films directed by Marshall Neilan
Goldwyn Pictures films
Silent American drama films
1923 drama films
Melodrama films
Films set in the Russian Empire
Russian Civil War films
Films set in Siberia
Cultural depictions of Nicholas II of Russia
Films shot in San Francisco
Films shot in Los Angeles
1920s American films